The International Marketing Review  is a peer-reviewed academic journal published by Emerald Group Publishing. It was established in 1983. The editors-in-chief are Jeryl Whitelock (University of Bradford) and John Cadogan (University of Loughborough).

Overview
According to the Journal Citation Reports, the journal has a 2009 impact factor of 1.164. The journal is ranked an 'A' in Europe, and an 'A' or 'B' in the rest of the world. The Australian New Zealand Association for Marketing has recently in 2011 recommended that IMR along with Psychology and Marketing be upgraded from 'B' to 'A' in Asia-Pacific marketing rankings.

External links
 

Business and management journals
Publications established in 1983
Quarterly journals
English-language journals
Emerald Group Publishing academic journals